rcirc is an Internet Relay Chat (IRC) client written in Emacs Lisp. It is one of two IRC clients included in GNU Emacs since release 22.1, alongside ERC.

Rcirc is "compact, written in a single file of less than 2,500 lines of code". It allocates separate buffers for each server and channel, and includes tab completion and inbound message timestamps. It allows opening new buffers for composing messages, useful for multiline work. All IRC commands are bound to control-c command shortcuts. Sound alerts are available for private messages and for when a user's nick is mentioned in channel.

See also

Comparison of IRC clients

References

External links
rcirc at EmacsWiki

Internet Relay Chat clients
Free Internet Relay Chat clients
Emacs modes